Selen may refer to
 Chemical element selenium, which is called selen in multiple languages
Selen (actress) (born Luce Caponegro in 1966), Italian actress and TV presenter
Selen (name)
RV MTA Selen, a Turkish research vessel

See also
 Selene (disambiguation)
Selens, a commune in the Aisne department in Hauts-de-France in northern France